Saint Piran's Day, or the Feast of Saint Piran, is the national day of Cornwall, held on 5 March every year. The day is named after one of the patron saints of Cornwall, Saint Piran, who is also the patron saint of tin miners.

Origins

St Piran's Day started as one of the many tinners' holidays observed by the tin miners of Cornwall. Other miners' holidays of a similar nature include Picrous Day and Chewidden Thursday. The miners of Breage and Germoe observed St Piran's feast day as that of their patron saint until at least 1764.

"St. Piran's Day was said to be a favourite with the tinners who having a tradition that some secrets regarding the manufacture of tin were communicated to their ancestors by that saint, they leave the manufacture to shift for itself for that day, and keep it as a holiday." There is little description of specific traditions associated with this day apart from the consumption of large amounts of alcohol and food during 'Perrantide', the week leading up to 5 March. The day following the St Piran's Day was known by many as 'Mazey Day', a term which has now been adopted by the revived Golowan festival in Penzance. The phrase 'drunk as a Perraner' was used in 19th century Cornwall to describe people who had consumed large quantities of alcohol.

Revival

The modern observance of St Piran's day as a national symbol of the people of Cornwall started in the late 19th and early 20th century when Celtic Revivalists sought to provide the people of Cornwall with a national day similar to those observed in other nations. Since the 1950s, the celebration has become increasingly observed and since the start of the 21st century almost every Cornish community holds some sort of celebration to mark the event. Saint Piran's Flag is also seen flying throughout Cornwall on this day.

Parades and celebrations take place in a number of towns and cities including:
 Bodmin – A parade through the streets with Cornish pipers and a children's dance. Speeches by various notables, including the town mayor, Lord Lieutenant, and Grand Bard of Cornwall, followed by children's performances of Cornish plays and songs. 400 people attended the parade in 2009. The parade was started in 1999.
 Bude – a St Piran's day walk led by a piper and attended by hundreds of people annually.
 Callington – Shop decorations and a St Piran's Supper with Cornish music and poetry.
 Falmouth – parade through the town including nearly 100 school children. Shop window competition.
 Penzance – annual performance of St Piran Furry dance and procession through the streets by 500 children. Annual St Piran Schools Concert.
 Redruth – first held in 2011 and billed as the biggest St Piran's celebration in Cornwall. It includes entertainments in the town centre before a parade to the rugby club where there are a market and fairground rides, as well as a rugby match. During the evening there are various live music events at venues across the town. In 2011 over 2000 people attended the rugby club events while hundreds more attended events in the town. 2012 saw three separate marches from different parts of the town converge as one giant procession at the miner's statue before heading to the rugby club.
 St Ives – Procession through the streets.
 Truro – Procession through the streets with speeches outside Truro Cathedral, which has a St Piran themed lunch menu in its café, and a Cornish folk music session afterwards. Hundreds of people attend the parade annually.
 United States – St Piran's day is also celebrated annually in Grass Valley, California, United States, to honour the Cornish miners who participated in the area's mining history beginning in the mid 19th century. In addition, Cornish genealogy organisations throughout the United States meet in celebration of Cornish history.

St Piran's Day Bank Holiday proposals
In 2006, Cornish MP Dan Rogerson asked the government to make 5 March a public holiday in Cornwall to recognise St Piran's Day celebrations. Some council workers in Bodmin were granted the holiday in 2006, and from 2009 Penzance Town Council has offered its employees a St Piran's Day Holiday, following a campaign by the Celtic League. A total of nine town and city councils across Cornwall have given their staff the day off.

There have been other calls and petitions for a Cornish public holiday on 5 March. It has been suggested that a move from the May Day Bank Holiday to a St Piran's Day Bank Holiday in Cornwall would be worth £20–35 million to the Cornish economy.

In December 2011, Cornwall Council voted in favour of asking the government to make St Piran's Day a bank holiday in Cornwall, should they decide to move the May Day holiday.

A petition for a county-wide day off on the Cornwall Council website closed with only 363 signatures, far short of the 50,000 signatures required.

Towns and cities that give their staff an annual day off work for St Piran's Day:
 Bodmin Town Council
 Penzance Town Council
 Truro City Council
 Hayle Town Council
 St Columb Major Town Council
 St Blazey Town Council
 St Ives Town Council
 Camelford Town Council
 Redruth Town Council

Schools that give parents the option of taking their children out of school for the day:
 Falmouth Secondary School
 Penryn Secondary School
 Mylor Primary School
 Mabe Primary School
 Mawnan Smith Primary School
 Flushing Primary School

See also 

List of county days in the United Kingdom
Yorkshire Day

References

External links

 BBC St Piran holiday call for Duchy
 St Piran's Day images from Newlyn's fishing industry
 St Piran's Day Events 2011
 An Daras: The Cornish Folk Art Project
 Who Was St Pieran?

 

Cornish culture
March observances
National days
Piran
Cornish nationalism
Festivals in Cornwall
Annual events in England
Cornish festivals